The Jordan 197 was the Formula One car with which the Jordan team competed in the 1997 Formula One World Championship.

Background

Driver change 
After a disappointing  season, Eddie Jordan opted to replace Rubens Barrichello and Martin Brundle with two young, inexperienced drivers - German rookie Ralf Schumacher, younger brother of double World Champion Michael Schumacher, and Italy's Giancarlo Fisichella, who had driven eight races for Minardi in 1996.

Technical specifications 
The car was powered by the 3-litre Peugeot A14 V10 engine and ran on Goodyear tyres.

Livery 
The team's title sponsor, for the second consecutive year, was Benson & Hedges.

The 197 stood out for its bright yellow "snake" livery. The car had a snake's eye and fang painted on either side of the nosecone, forked tongues that extended along the sides from the nosecone to the driver's cockpit, and numerous scale effects on other parts of the car. At Grands Prix held in countries that did not allow tobacco advertising, the Benson & Hedges labels were replaced with the snake-related "Bitten & Hisses", or "Ssssschuey" and "Fisssssssi".

Racing history 
Jordan’s move paid off, as Schumacher and Fisichella recorded six points finishes each, including three podiums - Schumacher third in Argentina, only his third F1 race, and Fisichella third in Canada and second in Belgium. Fisichella eventually finished ninth in the Drivers' Championship with 20 points while Schumacher was twelfth with 13 (both were subsequently promoted a place following Michael Schumacher's exclusion from the standings); the combined 33 points placed Jordan fifth in the Constructors' Championship.

Complete Formula One results
(key) (results in bold indicate pole position; results in italics indicate fastest lap)

References

AUTOCOURSE 1997-98, Henry, Alan (ed.), Hazleton Publishing Ltd. (1997) 

Jordan Formula One cars
1997 Formula One season cars